XECJC-AM is a talk radio station in Ciudad Juárez, Chihuahua, Mexico. Broadcasting on 1490 AM, XECJC is known as Radio Net.

History
Domingo Salayandia Nájera obtained the station's concession in 1972.

References

1972 establishments in Mexico
Radio stations established in 1972
Radio stations in Chihuahua
Spanish-language radio stations
News and talk radio stations in Mexico
Mass media in Ciudad Juárez